Slavica is a 1947 Yugoslav drama film directed by Vjekoslav Afrić.

Cast 
 Dubravko Dujšin - Sime
 Milica-Carka Jovanović - Luce
 Irena Kolesar - Slavica

References

External links 

1947 drama films
1947 films
Yugoslav black-and-white films
Yugoslav drama films
Films set in Yugoslavia
War films set in Partisan Yugoslavia
Serbo-Croatian-language films